The Armstrong Whitworth F.K.3 was a British two-seat general-purpose biplane built by Armstrong Whitworth Aircraft during the First World War. By the end of the war it was considered obsolete for combat.

History
The Dutch aircraft designer Frederick Koolhoven joined Armstrong Whitworth in 1914. He designed a series of aircraft that had his initials in their designation. The F.K.3 followed the basic layout of the Royal Aircraft Factory B.E.2c, which Armstrong Whitworth were building for the Royal Flying Corps. It was designed as an improvement, with a simplified structure that was easier to build. The prototype, first flown by Norman Spratt was powered by a 70 hp (52 kW) air-cooled Renault 70 hp V-8. This aircraft differed from the B.E.2 in eliminating welded joints and complex metal components in the structure, and having greater dihedral on the upper wing. It retained the seating layout of the B.E.2, with separate cockpits for the pilot and observer, with the latter in front. An initial batch of seven aircraft to this standard, sometimes referred to as the F.K.2 were built.

This initial batch offered little improvement over the BE.2, and was rejected for service in France. Aircraft following this initial batch were completed to a revised design, with a new fin and rudder, its leading edge straight and lacking the earlier comma shaped horn balance, and powered by the Renault-related but more powerful 90 hp (67 kW) RAF 1a engine. Both crew were placed in a single, extended cockpit with the pilot forward, allowing the observer a more effective field of fire, although in the event few F.K.3s were flown with armament. Trials at Upavon in May 1916 proved that the F.K.3 had a better performance in some respects than the B.E.2c, although it had a smaller useful load. Armstrong Whitworth were given a contract to build 150 aircraft with another 350 being built by Hewlett & Blondeau Limited at Luton. Some of the early batch had twin high exhaust pipes that exited above the upper wing in B.E.2 style, but these were later replaced with rams' horns forward stubs.

At one time during production of the F.K.3 there was a shortage of the RAF engines, and twelve aircraft were fitted with longer and heavier 120 hp (90 kW) six-cylinder inline water cooled Beardmore 120 hp. To carry the extra weight, span was increased by 2 ft (610 mm), but though the extra power enhanced the climb rate, top speed was little changed and these machines were converted back to RAF engines when they became available.

Operational Service
The F.K.3 was not adopted for use by operational squadrons of the RFC in France, as the more capable F.K.8 and R.E.8 were both already in prospect. Only one overseas unit received the F.K.3 (which was 47 Squadron at Salonika), all the other aircraft were based in the United Kingdom. Most of the aircraft were used for training until replaced by the Avro 504.

Military operators

 Australian Flying Corps
No. 3 Squadron AFC – Used for training.

Bulgarian Air Force
 One aircraft, No. 6219 captured in 1917
 –
Royal Flying Corps/Royal Air Force
No. 43 Squadron RFC
No. 47 Squadron RFC
No. 53 Squadron RFC
No. 55 Squadron RFC
No. 63 Squadron RFC

Specifications (F.K.3)

See also

References

Notes

Bibliography

 
 

F.K.03
F.K.03
Biplanes
Single-engined tractor aircraft
1910s British military reconnaissance aircraft
Aircraft first flown in 1915